Korven Kuningas ("King of the Woods") is the fifth studio album by Finnish folk metal band Korpiklaani. It was released on 21 March 2008 through Nuclear Blast Records. A record deal was signed with the company in September 2007. The cover was painted on this album, unlike the last few album covers, which were created using Adobe Photoshop. It features the old man, Vaari, who was also present on the Tales Along This Road and Tervaskanto covers.

"Korven Kuningas" was released as a limited first edition with bonus tracks, along with being released on white colored vinyl. There is also a digipak version limited and numbered to 500 copies that came with a drinking horn on a wall holder.

The title track ends at about 5:20. The remainder of the track is somber, droning timpanis.

Track listing

 The Japanese edition replaces track 9 with "Kipakka" (4:17)

Chart positions

Personnel
 Jonne Järvelä - vocals, guitars, djembe
 Matti Johansson - drums
 Jarkko Aaltonen - bass
 Cane - guitars
 Juho Kauppinen - accordion, guitars
 Hittavainen - fiddle, viola, recorder, mandolin

Production
 Jan "Örkki" Yrlund - cover art
 Mika Jussila - mastering
 Jonne Järvelä - producer
 Samu Oittinen - producer, recording, mixing
 Harri Hinkka - photography

References

2008 albums
Korpiklaani albums
Nuclear Blast albums